The following lists events that happened during 1886 in the Kingdom of Belgium.

Incumbents
Monarch: Leopold II
Prime Minister: Auguste Marie François Beernaert

Events

 18–29 March – Series of strikes and disturbances in industrial areas of Wallonia
 22 March – Law on copyright passed.
 4 April – Henri-Charles Lambrecht consecrated coadjutor bishop of Ghent
 10 April – Soldiers fire on strikers in Roux
 23 May – Provincial elections
 8 June – Partial legislative elections of 1886
 8 July – Royal decree establishing Royal Flemish Academy of Language and Literature

Publications
Periodicals
 Het Belfort begins publication
 La Wallonie begins publication
 Bulletin du Musée royal d'histoire naturelle de Belgique, vol. 4. 

Books
 Adolphe Burdo, Les Belges dans l'Afrique Centrale: De Zanzibar au lac Tanganika (P. Maes)
 Jean Stecher, Histoire de la Littérature néerlandaise en Belgique (Brussels, 1886)
 Émile Verhaeren, Les Moines

Art and architecture

Paintings
 Théo van Rysselberghe, Portrait of Marguerite van Mons

Sculptures
 Constantin Meunier, The Puddeler

Births
 4 February – René-Gabriel van den Hout, priest and editor (died 1969)
 12 February – Maurice Bladel, writer (died 1968)
 18 May – Marcel Wolfers, sculptor (died 1976)

Deaths
 9 February – Edmond Speelman (born 1819), Jesuit
 30 March – Jean-Joseph Charlier (born 1794), revolutionary
 5 July – Charles Baugniet (born 1814), artist
 11 July – Jules Malou (born 1810), politician
 6 August – Jean-François Abeloos (born 1819), sculptor

References

 
1880s in Belgium
Belgium
Years of the 19th century in Belgium
Belgium